Aishwarya Rajinikanth (born 1 January 1982) is an Indian film director and playback singer who works in Tamil cinema. She is the elder daughter of actor Rajinikanth and wife of actor Dhanush. She made her feature film directorial debut with 3 (2012) starring Dhanush and Shruti Haasan in the lead.

Early life
Aishwarya was born to actor Rajinikanth and Latha Rangachari. She has a younger sister, Soundarya, who works in the Tamil film industry as well.

Career 
Aishwarya began her career in the Tamil film industry as a playback singer in the unreleased film Ramanaa, directed by Parthy Bhaskar. The song was composed by Deva in November 2000. Her first song to be released was "Natpe Natpe" from D. Imman's soundtrack for Whistle (2003), which she sung alongside the composer and actor Silambarasan.

In August 2011, she announced that she would direct her husband, Dhanush, and Shruti Haasan in her first feature film titled 3. Dhanush later clarified that this would be his only film under his wife's direction. The film was highly anticipated prior to its release, after the song "Why This Kolaveri Di" from its soundtrack went viral and became an internet phenomenon. The song was composed by her cousin Anirudh Ravichander. She appeared alongside the lead cast and composer in the making of the video. In July 2015, Aishwarya announced she will soon launch a YouTube channel under the banner of "Ten Entertainment" to exclusively promote original content and short films by aspiring filmmakers.

She was a judge on STAR Vijay's dance competition Jodi Number One in its third season alongside actors Sangeetha and Jeeva. She became a playback singer with the film Whistle alongside Silambarasan, which was then followed by the song "Un Mela Aasadhan" in the film Aayirathil Oruvan, for which she also worked as an assistant director.

In August 2016, Aishwarya was selected as India's goodwill ambassador for the UN Women organization.

Criticism 
She performed Bharatanatyam at the UN headquarters on International Women's Day. However, her performance was criticised on social media by professional Bharatanatyam dancers. Popular Indian dancer Anita Ratnam wrote on Aishwarya's Facebook, "This is what bharatanatyam becomes... A caricature and a farce!".

Personal life 
Aishwarya was married to  actor Dhanush with whom she has two sons, Yatra (born 2006) and Linga (born 2010). The couple announced their separation through their respective social media handles on 17 January 2022.

In December 2016, Aishwarya Rajinikanth released her own memoir Standing on An Apple Box: The Story of A Girl Among the Stars. With this book, she has revealed her own story of being a celebrity kid, making her career choices, her marriage and her life as Rajinikanth’s daughter.

Filmography

As director

As singer

As dubbing artist

References

External links

 

1982 births
Living people
Indian women film directors
Television personalities from Tamil Nadu
Tamil film directors
Film directors from Chennai
Recipients of the Kalaimamani Award
21st-century Indian film directors
Indian female classical dancers
Performers of Indian classical dance
Dancers from Tamil Nadu
21st-century Indian dancers
Tamil playback singers
Women artists from Tamil Nadu
21st-century Indian women artists